Kermia albifuniculata is a species of sea snail, a marine gastropod mollusc in the family Raphitomidae.

Description

Distribution
This species occurs off New Caledonia and Mauritius.

References

 Hervier, J., 1897. Description d'espèce nouvelles de mollusques provenant de l'archipel de la Nouvelle-Calédonie (suite). Journal de Conchyliologie 44"1896": 138-151
 Liu J.Y. [Ruiyu] (ed.). (2008). Checklist of marine biota of China seas. China Science Press. 1267 pp.

External links
 

albifuniculata
Gastropods described in 1846